The Ministry of Finance of the Russian Soviet Federative Socialist Republic, known prior to 1946 as the People's Commissariat for Finance, or shortened to Narkomfin, was part of the government of the Russian Soviet Federative Socialist Republic from 1918 until the fall of the USSR in 1991. It was subordinate to the Ministry of Finance of the USSR.

History
The Narkomfin commissar was part of Sovnarkom. Nikolai Krestinsky was the first commissar, appointed in 1918. However, following the introduction of the New Economic Policy, Narkomfin was made responsible for Gosbank, the State Bank of the RSFSR and then the Soviet Union. On 26 November 1921, Lenin issued a note calling for the appointment of Grigory Sokolnikov, who took control of the organisation in 1922, although his formal position was not ratified until December 1922.

In 1946, the People's Commissariat for Finance was transformed and renamed into the Ministry of Finance of the RSFSR.

After the failed August Coup of 1991, Boris Yeltsin and the RSFSR Ministry of Finance claimed authority over the Ministry of Finance of the USSR, the Gosbank, and Vnesheconombank. These Soviet institutions could not carry out any orders without the consent of the RSFSR Ministry of Finance. The Ministry of Finance of the USSR continued functioning until the Ministry of Finance of the RSFSR issued a decree completing its takeover of the Soviet financial system. The RSFSR Ministry of Finance was succeeded by the Ministry of Economics and Finance of the Russian Federation (1991), and the Ministry of Finance of the Russian Federation (1992).

Commissars and ministers

See also 
 Government of the Soviet Union – Ministries
 Ministry of Finance of the USSR

References
Notes

Bibliography
 

People's commissariats and ministries of the Russian Soviet Federative Socialist Republic
Finance in the Soviet Union